Adolpho Lindenberg (born São Paulo, 1924) is a Brazilian civil engineer, architect, writer and political activist. A cousin and disciple of Plinio Corrêa de Oliveira, the founder of Tradition, Family and Property, he is the president of the Plinio Corrêa de Oliveira Institute, since his creation in 2006.

Professional career
He graduated in Civil Engineering and Architecture at the Mackenzie Presbyterian University, in 1949. He started his own entreprise, the Adolpho Lindenberg Construction Company (Portuguese: Construtora Adolpho Lindenberg) or CAL, in 1952, which became in short time, one of the most admired in Brazil. CAL name is associated with the reintroduction of the colonial style in Brazilian contemporary architecture. His style left a mark in many buildings of São Paulo. Since the 1950s, he created many buildings in the colonial style, because he believed it to be more suitable to Brazilian climate and culture than the Bauhaus style. From the 1960s to the 1980s, he authored many buildings in neoclassical or mediterranean style, with great success in the real estate market, to the point that about 60% of the luxury buildings in São Paulo from that time follow this style. His neoclassical style was named "Lindenberg style".

Activist career
Lindenberg was a longtime member of the Tradition, Family and Property, being a collaborator of their newspaper O Legionário, and later an editor of the newspaper, currently magazine, Catolicismo. After the division and legal dispute that followed Plinio Corrêa de Oliveira death, in 1995, he was a member of the Association of the Founders of TFP. After their judicial loss in 2004, they went to create the Plinio Corrêa de Oliveira Institute, in 2006, of which he has been the president since then. He identifies with the Catholic Traditionalist and has been linked to the far-right movement in Brazil.

References

1924 births
Living people
Mackenzie Presbyterian University alumni
Brazilian civil engineers
Brazilian architects
Brazilian Roman Catholics
Brazilian traditionalist Catholics
Brazilian people of German descent
20th-century Brazilian architects
20th-century Brazilian engineers
Catholicism and far-right politics
Tradition, Family, Property